Nipe Bay is a bay on the northern coast of Cuba in Holguín Province, part of the former Oriente Province. It is part of the municipalities of Mayarí and Antilla.

Overview
In Roman Catholic tradition, Nipe Bay is where the statue of Our Lady of Charity, Patroness of Cuba, was discovered miraculously around 1600.

A naval engagement during the Spanish–American War, the Battle of Nipe Bay, took place in the bay on July 21, 1898.

The Cuban leader Fidel Castro was born in Birán, near Nipe Bay, in 1926.

See also
Guatemala (village)
Cayo Saetía
Nipe-Sagua-Baracoa

References

Merriam-Webster's Geographical Dictionary, Third Edition, p. 830. Springfield, Massachusetts: Merriam-Webster, Incorporated, 1997. .

Bays of Cuba
Geography of Holguín Province
Mayarí